Nanjai Puliampatti is a panchayat village in Gobichettipalayam taluk in Erode District of Tamil Nadu state, India. It is about 9 km from Gobichettipalayam and 45 km from district headquarters Erode. The village is located on the road connecting Gobichettipalayam with Sathyamangalam via Vaniputhur. Nanjai Puliampatti has a population of about 1504.

References

Villages in Erode district